Barki Saraiya is a census town in the Sariya CD block in the Bagodar-Saria subdivision of  the Giridih district in the Indian state of Jharkhand.

Geography

Location                                 

Area overview
Giridih district is a part of the Chota Nagpur plateau, with rocky soil and extensive forests. Most of the rivers in the district flow from the west to east, except in the northern portion where the rivers flow north and north west. The district has coal and mica mines. It is an overwhelmingly rural district with small pockets of urbanisation.

Note: The map alongside presents some of the notable locations in the district. All places marked in the map are linked in the larger full screen map.

Demographics
According to the 2011 Census of India, Barki Saraiya had a total population of 18,933, of which 9,954 (53%) were males and 8,979 (47%) were females. Population in the age range 0–6 years was 2,988. The total number of literate persons in Barki Saraiya was 1,236 (77.52% of the population over 6 years).

Infrastructure
According to the District Census Handbook 2011, Giridih, Barki Saraiya covered an area of 18.68 km2. Among the civic amenities, it had 56 km roads with both open and covered drains, the protected water supply involved uncovered well, hand pump. It had 1,611 domestic electric connections, 45 road light points. Among the educational facilities it had 12 primary schools, 8 middle schools, 2 secondary schools, the nearest senior secondary school at Bagodar 13 km away. It had 1 non-formal education centre (Sarva Siksha Abhiyan). Among the social, recreational and cultural facilities it had 1 cinema theatre, 1 auditorium/ community hall. Three important commodities it produced were soaps, sweets, curd. It had the branch offices of 2 nationalised banks, 1 private commercial bank, 1 cooperative bank and 1 agricultural credit society.

Transport
Hazaribagh Road railway station is on the Asansol-Gaya section, a part of the Grand Chord, Howrah-Gaya-Delhi line and Howrah-Allahabad-Mumbai line.

References

Cities and towns in Giridih district